The National Space Institute at the Technical University of Denmark, also known as DTU Space, is a Danish sector research institute and a part of the Technical University of Denmark. It has a staff of 169, including researchers, engineers, and technicians.

The institute conducts research in astrophysics, Solar System physics, geodesy, and space technology. To conduct the research, the Institute collaborates with the Niels Bohr Institute for Astronomy, Geophysics and Physics.

It came about as a result of combining the Danish Space Research Institute with the geodesy part of the National Survey and Cadastre of Denmark on 1 January 2005 to form the Danish National Space Center (DNSC). In 2007, the DNSC merged with the Technical University of Denmark, and in 2008 changed its name to DTU Space.

The institute currently leads Swarm, a project to investigate the properties of the earth's magnetic field.

See also
 List of government space agencies

References

External links
 Webpage (English version)

Research institutes in Denmark
National Space Center
Space agencies
Government agencies established in 2005
2005 establishments in Denmark
Geodesy organizations